Cook Hill may refer to the following:

 Cook Hill (Albany County, New York), a summit in New York, United States

 Cook Hill, Grenada, a town in Saint Andrew Parish, Grenada

See also
 Cookhill, a village and civil parish in Worcestershire, England
 Cooks Hill, New South Wales, Australia